Piotr Pytlakowski (born 1951 in Warsaw) is a Polish journalist and screenwriter, from 1997 associated with the weekly "Polityka".

Biography 
He is the son of Jerzy Pytlakowski and Sabina née Wiernik (1918–1990). His mother came from a Jewish family.

He completed an extramural professional study of political science for journalist at the Institute of Journalism at the University of Warsaw. He worked, among others in "Gazeta Wyborcza", "Życie Warszawy", "Życie", and since 1997 he has been associated with the weekly "Polityka", where he handles with investigative journalism and criminal issues.

He won the Grand Press laureate in the "investigative journalism" category in 1999.

Filmography 
 W poszukiwaniu utraconych lat (2001) 
 Alfabet mafii (2004) 
 Alfabet mafii. Dekada mafijnej Warszawy (2004)
 Świadek koronny (2007) 
 Odwróceni (2007) 
 Ścigany (2010) 
 Wszystkie ręce umyte. Sprawa Barbary Blidy (2010) 
 Zbrodnie, które wstrząsnęły Polską (2012)

Publications 
 Piotr Pytlakowski, Republika MSW, Warszawa: „Andy Grafik” 1991, .
 Piotr Pytlakowski, Czekając na kata. Rozmowy ze skazanymi na śmierć, Warszawa: Niezależna Oficyna Wydawnicza 1996, .
 Ewa Ornacka, Piotr Pytlakowski, Alfabet mafii, Warszawa: Prószyński i S-ka 2004, .
 Sylwester Latkowski, Piotr Pytlakowski, Olewnik. Śmierć za 300 tysięcy, Warszawa: Świat Książki 2009, .
 Sylwester Latkowski, Piotr Pytlakowski, Wszystkie Ręce Umyte. Sprawa Barbary Blidy, Warszawa: Wydawnictwo MUZA S.A. 2010, .
 Sylwester Latkowski, Piotr Pytlakowski, Agent Tomasz i Inni. Przykrywkowcy, Warszawa: Świat Książki 2010, .
 Sylwester Latkowski, Piotr Pytlakowski, Biuro tajnych spraw. Kulisy Centralnego Biura Śledczego, Warszawa, Wydawnictwo Czarna Owca 2012, .
 Ewa Ornacka, Piotr Pytlakowski, Nowy alfabet mafii, Dom wydawniczy Rebis 2013
 Piotr Pytlakowski, Szkoła szpiegów, Warszawa, Wydawnictwo Czerwone i Czarne 2014, .
 Piotr Pytlakowski, Piotr Wróbel, Mój agent Masa, Poznań, Dom wydawniczy Rebis 2015
 Piotr Pytlakowski, Wspomnienia konduktora wagonów sypialnych. Powieść osobista, Warszawa: Wydawnictwo Czerwone i Czarne 2017,

References 

1951 births
Journalists from Warsaw
Living people